Bates's weaver (Ploceus batesi) is a species of bird in the family Ploceidae. It is endemic to Cameroon, and is often regarded as inexplicably rare across its distribution.

Description

Similar in size and shape to other members of the genus Ploceus. Males are distinctive in their yellow undersides, bright chestnut heads with limited black throats, and olive green backs.

Taxonomy

It is named after George Latimer Bates, who collected the type specimen (a young female) near the Dja River on 29 January 1906.

Distribution and habitat

Distribution

Known only from Cameroon.

Habitat

Its natural habitat is subtropical or tropical moist lowland forests.
It is threatened by habitat loss.

References

External links
 Bates's weaver -  Species text in Weaver Watch.

Bates's weaver
Endemic birds of Cameroon
Bates's weaver
Taxonomy articles created by Polbot